Jack Morrissey (14 July 1898 – 27 August 1968) was an Australian rules footballer who played with Carlton and North Melbourne in the Victorian Football League (VFL).

Notes

External links 

Jack Morrissey's profile at Blueseum

1898 births
Australian rules footballers from Victoria (Australia)		
Carlton Football Club players		
North Melbourne Football Club players
1968 deaths
People from Maryborough, Victoria